Ivey is a town in Wilkinson County, Georgia, United States. The population was 981 at the 2010 census.

History
The community was named after James Ivey. The Georgia General Assembly incorporated Ivey in 1950.

Geography

Ivey is located at  (32.909078, -83.300808).

Demographics

As of the census of 2000, there were 1,100 people, 434 households, and 314 families residing in the town. The racial makeup of the town was 97.55% White, 1.09% African American, 0.27% Native American, 0.09% from other races, and 1.00% from two or more races. Hispanic or Latino of any race were 0.73% of the population.

There were 434 households, out of which 33.6% had children under the age of 18 living with them, 58.5% were married couples living together, 11.1% had a female householder with no husband present, and 27.6% were non-families. 23.7% of all households were made up of individuals, and 8.1% had someone living alone who was 65 years of age or older.  The average household size was 2.53 and the average family size was 3.03.

In the town, the population was spread out, with 27.0% under the age of 18, 8.9% from 18 to 24, 29.9% from 25 to 44, 22.5% from 45 to 64, and 11.6% who were 65 years of age or older.  The median age was 36 years. For every 100 females, there were 87.7 males.  For every 100 females age 18 and over, there were 93.5 males.

The median income for a household in the town was $38,750, and the median income for a family was $41,071. Males had a median income of $31,083 versus $21,953 for females. The per capita income for the town was $16,710.  About 7.4% of families and 8.5% of the population were below the poverty line, including 12.1% of those under age 18 and 3.1% of those age 65 or over.

References

Towns in Georgia (U.S. state)
Towns in Wilkinson County, Georgia